James Powell (born 3 April 1792 at Eton, Buckinghamshire; died 5 May 1870 at Eton) was an English professional cricketer who played first-class cricket from 1818 to 1822.

Mainly associated with Marylebone Cricket Club (MCC), he made 8 known appearances in first-class matches.  He played for the Players in the Gentlemen v Players series.

References

External links
 CricketArchive profile

Further reading
 Arthur Haygarth, Scores & Biographies, Volumes 1-11 (1744-1870), Lillywhite, 1862-72

1792 births
1870 deaths
English cricketers
English cricketers of 1787 to 1825
Marylebone Cricket Club cricketers
Players cricketers
Non-international England cricketers
Epsom cricketers
Marylebone Cricket Club First 8 with 3 Others cricketers